The women's singles competition at the 2006 Abierto Mexicano Telcel tennis tournament was won by the German player Anna-Lena Grönefeld.

Draw

Finals

Section 1

Section 2

External links
Women's Draws

2006 Abierto Mexicano Telcel
Abierto Mexicano Telcel